Sintran III is a real-time, multitasking, multi-user operating system used with Norsk Data minicomputers from 1974. Unlike its predecessors Sintran I and II, it was written entirely by Norsk Data, in Nord Programming Language (Nord PL, NPL), an intermediate language for Norsk Data computers.

Overview
Sintran was mainly a command-line interface based operating system, though there were several shells which could be installed to control the user environment more strictly, by far the most popular of which was USER-ENVIRONMENT.

One of the clever features was to be able to abbreviate commands and file names between hyphens. For example, typing LIST-FILES would give users several prompts, including for print, paging etc. Users could override this using the following LI-FI ,,n, which would abbreviate the LIST-FILES command prompt and bypass any of the prompts. One could also refer to files in this way, for example, with PED H-W: which would refer to HELLO-WORLD:SYMB if this was the only file having H, any number of characters, a hyphen -, a W, any number of characters, and any file ending.

This saved many keystrokes and would allow users a very nice learning experience, from complete and self-explanatory commands like LIST-ALL-FILES to L-A-F for an advanced user. (The hyphen key on Norwegian keyboards resides where the slash key does on U.S. ones.)

Now that Sintran has mostly disappeared as an operating system, there are few references to it. However a job control or batch processing language was available named JEC, believed to be named Job Execution Controller, this could be used to set up batch jobs to compile COBOL programs, etc.

References

Discontinued operating systems
Norsk Data software
Proprietary operating systems
Real-time operating systems
1974 software